Ivor Bertie Gurney (28 August 1890 – 26 December 1937) was an English poet and composer, particularly of songs. He was born and raised in Gloucester. He suffered from bipolar disorder through much of his life and spent his last 15 years in psychiatric hospitals. Critical evaluation of Gurney has been complicated by this, and also by the need to assess both his poetry and his music. Gurney himself thought of music as his true vocation: "The brighter visions brought music; the fainter verse".

Life
Ivor Gurney was born at 3 Queen Street, Gloucester, in 1890, as the second of four surviving children of David Gurney, a tailor, and his wife Florence, a seamstress.

He showed musical ability at an early age. He sang as a chorister at Gloucester Cathedral from 1900 to 1906, when he became an articled pupil of Dr Herbert Brewer at the cathedral. There he met a fellow composer, Herbert Howells, who became a lifelong friend. Alongside Gurney and Howells, Brewer's third pupil at this time was Ivor Novello, then known as Ivor Davies. He also enjoyed an enduring friendship with the poet F. W. Harvey, whom he met in 1908.

The adults of most significance in Gurney's early life were the Rev. Alfred H. Cheesman, and two sisters, Emily and Margaret Hunt, who nurtured Gurney's interests in music and literature. Gurney began composing music at the age of 14, and won a scholarship to the Royal College of Music in 1911. He studied there with Charles Villiers Stanford, who also taught Ralph Vaughan Williams, John Ireland, Marion Scott, Rebecca Clarke, Frank Bridge, Arthur Bliss, Herbert Howells and many others. Stanford told Howells that Gurney was potentially "the biggest of them all", but he was "unteachable".

Gurney possessed a dynamic personality, but he had been troubled by mood swings that became apparent during his teenage years. He had a difficult time focusing on his work at college and suffered his first breakdown in 1913. After taking a rest, he seemed to recover and returned to college.

Gurney's studies were interrupted by World War I, when he enlisted as a private soldier in the Gloucestershire Regiment in February 1915. At the front, he began writing poetry seriously, sending his efforts to his friend, the musicologist and critic Marion Scott, who worked with Gurney as his editor and business manager. He was in the midst of writing the poems for what would become his first book, Severn and Somme, when he was wounded in the shoulder in April 1917. He recovered and returned to battle, still working on his book and composing music, including the songs "In Flanders" and "By A Bierside". Sidgwick & Jackson accepted Severn and Somme in July, with publication set for the autumn. In the meantime, Gurney was gassed in September the same year and sent to the Edinburgh War Hospital, where he met and fell in love with a VAD nurse, Annie Nelson Drummond, but the relationship later broke down.

There remains some controversy about the possible effects of the gas on his mental health, even though Gurney had clearly shown signs and symptoms of a bipolar disorder since his teens. "Being gassed (mildly) [his parenthesis] with the new gas is no worse than catarrh or a bad cold," Gurney wrote in a letter to Marion Scott on 17 September 1917. After his release from hospital, he was posted to Seaton Delaval, a mining village in Northumberland, where he wrote poems, including "Lying Awake in the Ward". His volume Severn and Somme was published in November 1917.

Mental illness

In March 1918, Gurney suffered a serious mental breakdown, triggered at least in part by the sudden ending of his relationship with Drummond. He was hospitalised in the Gallery Ward at Brancepeth Castle, County Durham, where he wrote several songs, despite the piano sounding, he said, like "a boiler factory in full swing because of the stone walls". In June he threatened suicide, but he did not attempt it.

Gurney slowly regained some of his emotional stability and in October was honourably discharged from the army. Gurney received an unconventional diagnosis of nervous breakdown from "deferred" shell shock. The notion that Gurney's instability should primarily be attributed to "shell shock" was perpetuated by Marion Scott, who used this term in the initial press releases after Gurney's death, as well as in his entry for Grove's Dictionary of Music and Musicians.

Gurney seemed to thrive after the war and was regarded as one of the most promising men of his generation, but his mental distress continued to worsen. He studied for a brief time with Ralph Vaughan Williams upon returning to the Royal College of Music, but he withdrew from the college before completing his studies. His second volume of poetry, War's Embers, appeared in May 1919 to mixed reviews. He continued to compose, producing a large number of songs, instrumental pieces, chamber music, and two works for orchestra: War Elegy (1920) and A Gloucestershire Rhapsody (1919–1921). His music was being performed and published. However, by 1922, his condition had deteriorated to the point where his family had him declared insane.

It has been speculated that Gurney's mental problems may have resulted from syphilis, contracted either while he was a music student before the war, or perhaps while serving as a soldier in France. Blevins, Gurney's biographer, however, concludes that he did not suffer from syphilis. The issue has also been discussed, more recently, by Cambridge academic and broadcaster Kate Kennedy.

Gurney spent the last 15 years of his life in psychiatric hospitals, first for a short period at Barnwood House in Gloucester, and then at the City of London Mental Hospital, Dartford, where he was diagnosed as suffering from "delusional insanity (systematised)". Gurney wrote prolifically during the asylum years, producing some eight collections of verse. His output included two plays in Shakespearean style – Gloucester Play (1926) and The Tewkesbury Trial (1926). During this time he appeared to believe himself to be William Shakespeare in person. He continued also to compose music but to a far lesser degree. An examination of his archive suggests that up to two-thirds of his musical output remains unpublished and unrecorded.

By the 1930s Gurney wrote little of anything, although he was described by Scott as being "so sane in his insanity".

Death and legacy

Gurney died of tuberculosis while still a patient at the City of London Mental Hospital, shortly before dawn on 26 December 1937, aged 47. He was buried in Twigworth, near Gloucester. The service was conducted by his godfather, Rev. Alfred Cheesman. Gurney was "a lover and maker of beauty", it was stated on his gravestone. (The stone was replaced after it was damaged – the original is now stored inside Twigworth church.) Marion Scott preserved Gurney's manuscripts and letters and worked with composer Gerald Finzi to ensure that his legacy should not be forgotten.

On 11 November 1985, Gurney was among 16 Great War Poets commemorated on a slate stone unveiled in Westminster Abbey's Poet's Corner. The inscription on the stone was written by a fellow Great War poet, Wilfred Owen: "My subject is War, and the pity of War. The Poetry is in the pity."

In 2000, a stained-glass window was installed in St Mary de Lode Church, Gloucester and dedicated to the memory of Ivor Gurney. A memorial to Gurney was erected in 2009 Sint-Juliaan, near Ypres, close to the spot where he was the victim of a mustard gas attack in 1917.

A sculpture by Wolfgang Buttress entitled The Candle was unveiled in 2011 in Victoria Dock, Gloucester Docks; it is inscribed with lines from Gurney's poem "Requiem" around the base. There is also a blue plaque memorial to Gurney in Eastgate Street, Gloucester.

In April 2014, BBC Four broadcast a documentary about Gurney, entitled The Poet Who Loved the War, presented by Tim Kendall, which focused on how the First World War had in some ways helped Gurney through the periods of depression he suffered and helped him become one of the war's foremost poets.

In June and July 2014 Gurney was the subject of BBC Radio 3's Composer of the Week, based on Dr Kate Kennedy's biography, Ivor Gurney: Dweller in Shadows, as part of the station's Music in the Great War series. The programmes included a number of Gurney's pieces, especially recorded by the BBC.

Works

Compositions

Gurney wrote hundreds of poems and more than 300 songs but only set a handful of his own poems to music, the best-known being "Severn Meadows". His well-known compositions include his Five Elizabethan Songs (or 'The Elizas' as he called them), written in 1913-14 while he was still a student at the Royal College of Music. The song cycles Ludlow and Teme (published 1923) and The Western Playland, (published 1926), both settings of poetry by A. E. Housman, were prepared for publication with the help of admirers and friends, including Gerald Finzi and his wife Joy, Howard Ferguson and Marion Scott. Oxford University Press issued two sets of ten songs in 1938, a year after his death, selected and edited by Finzi and Ferguson. Three further sets of ten songs came out in 1952, 1959 and 1979.

Gurney set to music many of the poems of his contemporaries, including at least nineteen poems written by Edward Thomas, six of them collected in the orchestral song cycle Lights Out published in 1926, and at least seven by W. H. Davies. All of Gurney's settings from the Canadian poet Bliss Carman's Sappho: One Hundred Lyrics (1904) were gathered together in a new collection, Seven Sappho Songs by Richard Carder in 1998.

It has been suggested that there is something of Schubert and Schumann, but considerably less of the prevailing folk idiom of the time, in the intensity of Gurney's musical language. He had a preference for setting dark ballads, as Schubert, Loewe and Brahms had before him, and "knew his Brahms and Schumann backwards, as his piano pieces testify". But where he does lean towards folksong, as in his setting of Belloc's "Ha’nacker Mill", it is often hard to tell whether the melody is original or traditional.

His Five Preludes for piano were written in 1919-20 and published the following year. He also wrote as many as 20 string quartets, although most of these are lost. The String Quartet in D minor, composed in 1924, received its premiere recording in 2020.

War poet/local poet
Edmund Blunden, at the urging of Gerald Finzi, assembled the first collection of Gurney's poetry which was published in 1954. This was followed by P. J. Kavanagh's Collected Poems, first published in 1982 and reissued in 2004. It remains the most comprehensive edition of Gurney's poetry. Gurney is regarded as one of the great World War I poets, and like others of them, such as Edward Thomas, whom he admired, he often contrasted the horrors of the front line with the beauty and tranquillity of his native English landscape – these themes were explored in the 2012 musical play A Soldier and a Maker.

Deliberately unrhetorical in his poetic tone, and writing as a ranker, not an officer, Gurney offered a complex, wry, unheroic view of the soldierly world of the Western Front: presenting not a large statement (for or against war), but an individual experience. Without diminishing the horrors of the front line, Gurney's poems often emphasise the moments of relief. "On Rest" was above all what he called "the relief of knowing mere being". By detailing the "small trifles" of trench life – moments of comradeship, letters from home, singsongs, bread and Fray Bentos corned beef, wine, chocolate and café-au-lait Gurney was able (in Blunden's words) to "express part of the Western Front secret... with distinctive, intimate and imaginative quickness." In so far as he had a "manifesto", it was to present "the protest of the physical against the exalted spiritual; of the cumulative weight of small facts against the one large".

At the same time, Gurney was something of a local poet, rooted in Gloucester and its surroundings, which remained a touchstone of reality for him, in the front line and later in the asylum. In the preface to his first book, he wrote of "my county, Gloucester, that whether I live or die stays always with me." His tribute poem "Crickley Hill" was described by Edna Longley as "perhaps Gurney's most rapturous expression of local patriotism".

Posthumous collections of poetry and letters
Severn & Somme and War's Embers, ed. R. K. R. Thornton. Carcanet Press, 1997
80 Poems or So, ed. George Walter and R. K. R. Thornton. Carcanet Press, 1997
Rewards of Wonder: Poems of London, Cotswold and France, ed. George Walter. Carcanet Press, 2000
Best Poems and The Book of Five Makings, ed. R.K.R. Thornton. Carcanet Press, 1995
Collected Poems, ed. P.J. Kavanagh. Fyfield Books (Carcanet Press), 2004
Stars in a Dark Night: The Letters from Ivor Gurney to the Chapman Family. Anthony Boden (ed.), The History Press, 2004 (2nd edition)

Five Elizabethan songs
"Orpheus" (John Fletcher)
"Sleep" (John Fletcher)
"Spring" (Thomas Nashe)
"Tears" (anon.)
"Under the Greenwood Tree" (William Shakespeare)

Other songs
collections: A First Volume of Ten Songs (FV); A Second Volume of Ten Songs (SV); Five Songs (FS); Lights Out (LO); Ludlow and Teme (LT); Seven Sappho Songs (SS); The Western Playland (WP)

Selected poems
The following poems provide an introduction to his work:
"Strange Hells" – The effect of war on soldiers' psyches
"The Ballad of Three Spectres" – A soldier's vision
"Maisemore" – A soldier thinks of home
"The Estaminet" – Comradeship
"Purple and Black" – The politics of death
"To the Poet before Battle" – A soldier poet prepares for the fight
"To His Love" – A soldier writes to a dead comrade's lover of his death
"The Silent One" – An account of a moment of terror during a battle

See also
George Butterworth

References

Sources

Kate Kennedy, ed. 'Ivor Gurney: Poet, Composer', Ivor Gurney Society Journal 2007
Pamela Blevins, "Ivor Gurney and Marion Scott: Song of Pain and Beauty", The Boydell Press, 2008
Pamela Blevins, "New Perspectives on Ivor Gurney's Mental Illness", The Ivor Gurney Society Journal, Vol. 6, 2000, pp. 29–58
Pamela Blevins, "One Last Chance: Dr. Randolph Davis and Ivor Gurney", The Ivor Gurney Society Journal, Vol. 9, 2003, pp. 91–99

External links

The Ivor Gurney Trust
The Ivor Gurney Society (UK based site)
The Ivor Gurney Society (US based site)
Gurney Literary Archive and profile, Oxford University

1890 births
1937 deaths
Burials in Gloucestershire
20th-century classical composers
Alumni of the Royal College of Music
British Army personnel of World War I
English classical composers
English male classical composers
English World War I poets
20th-century male writers
20th-century deaths from tuberculosis
Gloucestershire Regiment soldiers
History of mental health in the United Kingdom
People with mental disorders
People from Gloucester
People educated at the King's School, Gloucester
Poètes maudits
Pupils of Charles Villiers Stanford
20th-century English composers
20th-century British male musicians
Tuberculosis deaths in England
Deaths in mental institutions
Military personnel from Gloucestershire